Flight 611 may refer to:

Southwest Air Lines Flight 611, landing accident on 26 August 1982
China Airlines Flight 611, crashed on 25 May 2002
DHL Flight 611, collided with Bashkirian Charter Flight 2937 in the Überlingen mid-air collision on 1 July 2002
Air India Express Flight 611, tail strike and antenna collision on takeoff due to captain seat failure on 11 October 2018

0611